Iris serotina is a species in the genus Iris, it is also in the subgenus Xiphium. It is a bulbous perennial from southern Europe, found in Spain and Morocco.

Description
They appear in the autumn, but then fade before flowering.

It normally has 2 - 3 flowers per stem, and generally blooms in late July, or August.

Like other irises, it has 2 pairs of petals, 3 large sepals (outer petals), known as the 'falls' and 3 inner, smaller petals (or tepals), known as the 'standards'. It has blue-violet flowers, the petals are veined with a deeper violet colour, and the falls are marked with a yellow patch.
 
Its seeds are small, yellow and semi-circular.

Taxonomy
The specific epithet serotina, refers to the Latin word, 'serotina' meaning late in flowering.

In 1861, Heinrich Moritz Willkomm described Iris serotina after seeing plants from Province of Jaén (Spain). Originally, he called it Iris filifolia, but this was later corrected to Iris serotina. Then published in 'Prodromus Florae Hispanicae' Vol.1 in 1861. It was later illustrated in Curtis's Botanical Magazine No.733 in 1977.

Iris serotina is an accepted name by the RHS, and it was verified by United States Department of Agriculture and the Agricultural Research Service on 4 April 2003, then updated on 3 December 2004.

Distribution and habitat
Iris serotina is native to temperate areas of Europe.

Range
Originally found in South eastern Spain. It has been found in Cuenca, Jaen and in the Province of Granada. It also has been found in Rif in Morocco.

Habitat
It grows on rocks, on the shadow side of the mountains.

Conservation
It is classed as 'Endangered', and was on the 1997 IUCN Red List of Threatened Plants in Spain.

Cultivation
It is best grown in a bulb frame or a very sheltered dry border, in the UK.

Toxicity
Like many other irises, most parts of the plant are poisonous (rhizome and leaves), if mistakenly ingested can cause stomach pains and vomiting. Also handling the plant may cause a skin irritation or an allergic reaction.

References

Other sources
 Fennane, M. & M. I. Tattou. 1998. Catalogue des plantes vasculaires rares, menacées ou endémiques du Maroc. Bocconea 8:205. 
 Maire, R. C. J. E. et al. 1952–. Flore de l'Afrique du Nord. (F Afr Nord) 
 Mathew, B. 1981. The Iris. (Iris) 137. 
 Tutin, T. G. et al., eds. 1964–1980. Flora europaea. (F Eur)

External links

serotina
Plants described in 1861
Flora of Morocco
Flora of Spain
Flora of Southwestern Europe
Flora of Europe